Eucratodes agassizii is a species of crabs in the family Xanthidae, the only species in the genus Eucratodes.

References

Xanthoidea
Taxa named by Alphonse Milne-Edwards
Monotypic arthropod genera